Cassandra McIntosh (born 10 November 1992) is an Australian professional wrestler. She is best known for her time in WWE, where she performed under the ring name Peyton Royce and for her time in Impact Wrestling where she performed as Cassie Lee.

In February 2009, McIntosh made her professional wrestling debut at Pro Wrestling Women's Alliance (PWWA) as KC Cassidy, and competed on the independent circuit with multiple promotions for several years, becoming a one-time PWA Women's Champion, and winning the Vera and Jenny Memorial Cup in support of breast cancer. McIntosh signed a contract with WWE in 2015, and was assigned to WWE's developmental brand NXT in Orlando, Florida.

Early life 
McIntosh was born in Sydney, New South Wales and later moved to Melbourne, Victoria and then Calgary, Alberta, Canada to train with Lance Storm. Prior to her training, she excelled in dance. She attended the same high school, Westfields Sports, as fellow wrestler and future tag team partner Jessie McKay. McIntosh began watching wrestling at the age of 9, and cites Eddie Guerrero as her inspiration to become a professional wrestler.

Professional wrestling career

Independent circuit (2009–2015) 
On 28 February 2009, McIntosh made her professional wrestling debut in Pro Wrestling Women's Alliance as KC Cassidy, teaming with Robbie Eagles in a mixed tag team match, defeating Madison Eagles and Mike Valuable. For the next year in the promotion, she traded victories with Jessie McKay in singles matches, including a loss in a PWWA championship match. On 7 January 2011, she unsuccessfully challenged Madison Eagles for the championship. On 20 June 2011, KC Cassidy and Tenille Tayla defeated Eliza Sway and Shazza McKenzie. Cassidy made two appearances for the American all-female promotion Shimmer Women Athletes as Bambi Hall's tag team partner. She was originally the scheduled opponent for Su Yung at a Shine Wrestling event in Ybor City, Florida, but instead became the replacement opponent for Rhia O'Reilly. She also appeared for promotions Pro Wrestling Alliance Australia, New Horizons Pro Wrestling, Melbourne City Wrestling and Riot City Wrestling.

WWE (2015–2021)

Early years in NXT (2015–2016) 
McIntosh received a tryout with WWE during their tour of Australia in August 2014 and became an NXT trainee on 13 April 2015. She made her televised in-ring debut on the 15 May episode of NXT, using the KC Cassidy name in a loss to NXT Women's Champion Sasha Banks. On the 22 July episode of NXT, McIntosh (as Cassie) lost to Eva Marie. On 7 August, she was given the new ring name Peyton Royce. After being a face throughout her NXT run, Royce began wrestling as a heel in a non-title loss to NXT Women's Champion Bayley on the 9 December episode of NXT. On the 13 January 2016 episode of NXT, Royce competed in a number one contender's battle royal for Bayley's NXT Women's Championship, which was won by Carmella.

The IIconics (2016–2021) 

In October, Royce formed an alliance with Billie Kay, later dubbed The Iconic Duo. The duo subsequently entered a feud with Liv Morgan, which culminated in a six-woman tag team match on the 23 November episode of NXT, in which Morgan, Aliyah, and Ember Moon defeated Royce, Kay, and Daria Berenato. In the end of December, Kay and Royce were placed in a brief feud with the NXT Women's Champion Asuka after the latter stated there is no competition for her. On 28 January 2017 at TakeOver: San Antonio, Royce competed in a fatal four-way match against Kay, Nikki Cross, and Asuka, in which Royce failed to capture the NXT Women's Championship. Shortly after that, in the end of February, Royce defeated Ember Moon and Liv Morgan in a triple–threat to earn another opportunity at Asuka's NXT Women's Championship, which she once again failed to win.

Throughout the year, Royce continued to rack up victories over competitors like Aliyah, Sarah Logan, and Ruby Riot. After defeating Liv Morgan and Nikki Cross in a triple-threat match, at TakeOver: WarGames, Royce competed in a fatal four-way match for the vacant NXT Women's Championship, which was ultimately won by Ember Moon. In December, Royce lost to Moon in a non-title match, which was her final match for NXT. Royce made her first main roster appearance on 8 April 2018 at WrestleMania 34, competing along with several other NXT superstars in the first WrestleMania Women's Battle Royal where she was eliminated by Sarah Logan.

Royce and Kay, now dubbed The IIconics, made their main roster debut on the 10 April 2018 episode of SmackDown Live attacking SmackDown Women's Champion Charlotte Flair, while she was cutting a promo about her match at WrestleMania 34. Two weeks later, The IIconics racked up their first victory, as part of the main roster, over Asuka and Becky Lynch. Throughout the next few months, Royce competed in various singles and tag team matches but ended up on the losing end on them all. In August, The IIconics started their first feud on the main roster, with Naomi, and the two were able to defeat her in singles matches. Eventually, Naomi teamed up with Asuka but lost to The IIconics at the Super Show-Down on 6 October, held in the latter's homeland of Australia. Three weeks later, both Royce and Kay took part in WWE's first all-women's pay-per-view, Evolution; they were the first two eliminated from a battle royal for a future women's championship match.

On 27 January 2019, both Kay and Royce entered their first Royal Rumble match at number 7 and number 9, respectively, and they managed to eliminate Nikki Cross, before they both were eliminated by Lacey Evans. On 17 February, at the Elimination Chamber event, The IIconics competed in a tag team Elimination Chamber match for the inaugural WWE Women's Tag Team Championship, which was won by The Boss 'n' Hug Connection (Bayley and Sasha Banks). In March, The IIconics started a feud with Banks and Bayley, whom they defeated in a non-title match. Because of their win, they (and two other teams) challenged Banks and Bayley for the championship at WrestleMania 35 in a fatal four-way match. At the event, which took place on 7 April, The IIconics won the match after Kay pinned Bayley to win the Women's Tag Team Championship for the first time. On the 5 August episode of Raw, The IIconics lost the titles to Alexa Bliss and Nikki Cross in a fatal four-way match.

On 16 October 2019, it was announced that The IIconics had been drafted to Raw as supplemental picks of the 2019 WWE Draft. After a brief hiatus, Royce and Kay made their return on the 11 May 2020 episode of Raw, interrupting WWE Women's Tag Team Champions Alexa Bliss and Nikki Cross. They later defeated the champions in a non-title match. They would unsuccessfully challenge for the WWE Women's Tag Team Championships multiple times throughout the summer. They would begin a feud with Ruby Riott mocking her backstage for not having any friends. They would go on to trade victories as Kay and Royce defeated Riott while Riott defeated Kay. At Payback, The IIconics were defeated by Riott and her newly reunited tag partner Liv Morgan. The following night on Raw, The IIconics were forced to disband after losing to The Riott Squad per stipulation. 

On 12 October 2020 during the 2020 WWE Draft, Peyton remained on Raw, while her former tag team partner Billie moved to SmackDown. She would begin to team with Lacey Evans until Evans announced her pregnancy. On the 22 March 2021 episode of Raw, Royce faced Raw Women's Champion Asuka in a losing effort. This would in turn be her final match in WWE, as on 15 April 2021, Royce was released from her WWE contract along with other WWE talent including her former partner Billie Kay.

Impact Wrestling (2021–2022) 
At Knockouts Knockdown on 9 October 2021, it was announced that The IIconics, now known as The IInspiration, would be making their debut for Impact Wrestling at Bound for Glory. At Bound for Glory, they defeated Decay (Havok and Rosemary) to win the Impact Knockouts World Tag Team Championship. On 20 November, at Turning Point, The IInspiration had their first successful title defense, when they defeated Decay once again.At Sacrifice, The IInspiration lost the titles to The Influence (Madison Rayne and Tenille Dashwood).

On April 27, McIntosh and McKay requested their immediate release from Impact Wrestling, with a statement they released on their Twitter accounts.

Other media 
McIntosh as Peyton Royce made her WWE video game debut as a playable character in WWE 2K18 and has since appeared in WWE 2K19, WWE 2K20, WWE 2K22 and WWE 2K Battlegrounds.

On 16 May 2021, McIntosh along with longtime tag team partner and best friend Jessica McKay launched a comedy and variety podcast titled Off Her Chops.

Personal life
In August 2019, McIntosh married Canadian wrestler Ronnie Arneill, best known by his ring names Shawn Spears and Tye Dillinger, On August 3, 2022, the couple announced that they are expecting their first child, later revealed to be a boy. On January 17, 2023, they welcomed their son Austin Jay Arneill.

Championships and accomplishments 
 
Impact Wrestling
Impact Knockouts World Tag Team Championship (1 time) – with Jessie McKay
 Melbourne City Wrestling
 Vera and Jenny Memorial Cup (2014)
 Prairie Wrestling Alliance
 PWA Women's Championship (1 time)
 Pro Wrestling Illustrated
 Ranked 43 of the top 50 female wrestlers in the PWI Female 50 in 2017
 Ranked No. 50 of the top 50 tag teams in the PWI Tag Team 50 in 2020 – with Billie Kay
 Ranked No. 51 of the top 150 female wrestlers in the PWI Women's 150 in 2021
 Sports Illustrated
 Ranked No. 24 in the top 30 female wrestlers in 2018
 WWE
 WWE Women's Tag Team Championship (1 time) – with Billie Kay
 NXT Year-End Award (1 time)
 Breakout of the Year (2016) – with Billie Kay

References

External links 
 The IInspiration's Impact Wrestling profile
 
 
 
 

1992 births
Australian female professional wrestlers
Australian expatriate sportspeople in the United States
Expatriate professional wrestlers
Living people
Professional wrestling managers and valets
Professional wrestling trainers
Sportswomen from New South Wales
Sportspeople from Sydney
21st-century professional wrestlers
TNA/Impact Knockouts World Tag Team Champions
WWE Women's Tag Team Champions